Benjamin Swan is a former American state legislator who served in the Massachusetts House of Representatives and represented the 11th Hampden District from 2009-2016.

On February 6, 2014, Swan was one of five members of the legislative body to vote against the expulsion of State Representative Carlos Henriquez, who had been convicted of assault.

Before being elected a state legislator, Swan served for a time as the president of the Springfield, Massachusetts NAACP and unsuccessfully ran for mayor of Springfield in the 1991 and 1993 mayoral elections Swan was a black community activist, and had a career as a management and education consultant.

See also
 Massachusetts House of Representatives' 12th Hampden district

References

Living people
Members of the Massachusetts House of Representatives
Date of birth missing (living people)
21st-century American politicians
Year of birth missing (living people)
Activists from Massachusetts
People from Belzoni, Mississippi